The 1985 season of the astronomy TV show Jack Horkheimer: Star Hustler starring Jack Horkheimer started on January 1, 1985. During this season, the show still had its original name, Jack Horkheimer: Star Hustler. The show's episode numbering scheme changed several times during its run to coincide with major events in the show's history. The official Star Gazer website hosts the complete scripts for each of the shows.


1985 season

References

External links 
  Star Gazer official website
 
 August 19-25, 1985 episode on YouTube
 August 26-September 1, 1985 episode on YouTube
 October 21-27, 1985 episode on YouTube

Jack Horkheimer:Star Hustler
1985 American television seasons